Fred Bednarski is a retired American football placekicker.  He is often credited with introducing the "soccer-style" kick to American football, setting a new standard for kickers in the sport.

Early life
Born in Poland during the Russian and then German occupation of the country in World War II, his family was taken to a Nazi labor camp outside of Salzburg, Austria in 1942, where they would spend three years.  He considered himself fortunate for having been taken a "labor" or "concentration" camp rather than an extermination camp, as was the fate for many other Polish families.  At the camps, when they could find some free time, Bednarski recalls playing games with other camp detainees using makeshift soccer balls constructed from rolled-up socks.

Career
Bednarski's football career began with the Texas Longhorns in 1956 after Head Coach Darrell Royal of the Washington Huskies was informed by his scout who had just returned from scouting Texas for the team about the "soccer-style" kicker named Bednarski.  In contrast to the traditional football kick used at the time in which the kicker would approach the ball from directly behind and contact the ball with his foot, Bednarski approached the ball from roughly a 45-degree angle and made contact with the ball with the side of his foot, swinging his like in a "golf club"-like motion.

On October 19, 1957, Bednarski kicked the first-ever "soccer-style" field goal in American football history, giving the team a 3-0 lead against Arkansas with the 38-yard kick.

See also
Mauthausen-Gusen concentration camp
Pete Gogolak

References

Further reading
The Alcalde

Living people
Polish emigrants to the United States
Nazi concentration camp survivors
American football placekickers
Texas Longhorns football players
Year of birth missing (living people)
1940s births